Dublin 4, also rendered as D4 and D04, is a historic postal district of Dublin, Ireland including Baggot Street Upper, the southernmost fringes of the Dublin Docklands, and the suburbs of Ballsbridge, Donnybrook, Irishtown, Merrion, Ringsend (including South Lotts and parts of Grand Canal Dock) and Sandymount, on the Southside of Dublin. Most of the area was known as Pembroke Township until 1930 when it was absorbed by the City and County Borough of Dublin.

The headquarters of the national broadcaster RTÉ, the RDS, Merrion Centre, University College Dublin, Aviva Stadium, Google and a number of foreign embassies to Ireland are all located in D4.

It is Ireland's most expensive postcode. At the height of the Celtic Tiger economic boom, Shrewsbury Road in D4 was the sixth most expensive street in the world, with one property on the street selling for €58 million. As of 2022, the average property price in the district was almost €1 million.

Popular culture
Dublin 4 or its abbreviation, D4, is sometimes used as a pejorative adjective to describe Dublin's upper-middle class based on the perceived characteristics of residents of this area. However, it sometimes even used to refer to the Irish upper middle class in general, regardless of whether or not they live in the D4 area. In this sense the term signifies a set of attitudes apparently in opposition to those held by "the plain people of Ireland" by Irish commentators such as Desmond Fennell.

While the area has, for most of its existence, been seen as well-to-do, the use of the term D4 as an adjective emerged in the 1990s. The fictional jock Ross O'Carroll-Kelly was meant as a caricature of this.

The term has been used to describe the aspirational upper middle-class from south Dublin and also used by Fianna Fáil members who like to portray themselves as being on the side of "the plain people of Ireland".

Accent
A change in accent occurred between those born roughly before 1970 and those born in the early 1970s or later.

In the early 1980s, a group of people in Dublin 4 developed a different accent, partly in rejection of older views of Irishness. The accent was known as "Dublin 4", "Dartspeak" or later "DORTspeak/Formers Morket" (after the Dublin 4 pronunciation of DART, which runs through the area). It has also been noticed that people who move into the area and parts of south Dublin from outside the county and who would normally speak in their native accent develop the DORT accent as well. The accent quickly became the subject of ridicule.

Quotes
Two examples of "Dublin 4" being used to refer to alleged wealth:

Sometimes the antonym plain people of Ireland or plain people was contrasted with it:

Usage in Dublin addresses 
Colloquially, Dubliners simply refer to the area as "Dublin 4" or "D4". The postal district forms the first part of numerous seven digit Eircodes that are unique to every single address in the area. For addressing purposes, it appears in both its original form as Dublin 4 and as the first part of a seven digit postal code as D04 a line below. For example:  
 The Embassy of Switzerland
 6 Ailesbury Road
 Dublin 4
 D04 W205

Gallery

See also

Dublin postal districts
List of Eircode routing areas in Ireland
Ross O'Carroll-Kelly
West Brit

References

Irish culture
Places in Dublin (city)
Postal districts of Dublin